Jason Brevoort Brown (February 26, 1839 – March 10, 1898) was an American lawyer and politician who served three terms as a U.S. Representative from Indiana from 1889 to 1895.

Biography 
Born in Dillsboro, Indiana, Brown attended the common schools and Wilmington Academy, Dearborn County, Indiana.
He studied law and was admitted to the bar in 1860; thence he commenced practice in Brownstown, Indiana.  He served as a member of the state house of representatives 1862-1866 and as member of the state senate in 1870. Brown served as Secretary of the Territory of Wyoming from 1873 to 1875.  He moved to Seymour, Indiana, in 1875, and later became a member of the state senate 1880-1883.

Congress 
Brown was elected as a Democrat to the Fifty-first, Fifty-second, and Fifty-third Congresses (March 4, 1889 – March 3, 1895).
He served as chairman of the Committee on Elections (Fifty-third Congress).
He was an unsuccessful candidate for renomination in 1894.

Later career and death 
He resumed the practice of law in Seymour, Indiana, and died there March 10, 1898.
He was interred in Riverview Cemetery.

References

1839 births
1898 deaths
People from Dillsboro, Indiana
Democratic Party Indiana state senators
Democratic Party members of the Indiana House of Representatives
Wyoming Territory officials
Democratic Party members of the United States House of Representatives from Indiana
19th-century American politicians